Manda is an upazila of Naogaon District in the Division of Rajshahi, Bangladesh.

History 
 During the War of Liberation in 1971 the Pak army killed 128 innocent persons at village Pakuria of Bharsho Union and buried them in 3-4 ditches.
 During the War of Liberation in 1971 the Pak army killed 17 innocent persons and burned a whole village Monhorpur (Manoharpur) of Paranpur Union and buried them in a mass grave.

Geography 

It has 58493 households and total area 375.94 km2. It is bounded by Mahadebpur upazila on the north, Bagmara and Mohanpur upazilas on the south, Naogaon sadar, Raninagar and Atrai upazilas on the east, Niamatpur and Tanore upazilas on the west. Its major rivers are the Atrai and Shiba.

Demographics 
According to 2011 Bangladesh census, Manda had a population of 363,858. Males constituted 49.48% of the population and females 50.52%. Muslims formed 90.58% of the population, Hindus 8.74%, Christians 0.05% and others 0.64%. Manda had a literacy rate of 46.27% for the population 7 years and above.

Points of interest

Kushumba Mosque
Location
On the west bank of Atrai river, under the Manda upazila of Naogaon district, the mosque named Kusumba is situated.

History
Kusumba Mosque is named after the village Kusumba. It was built during the period of Afgan rule in Bangladesh by a high-ranking official named Sulaiman. It was built under one of the last Suri rulers. His name was Ghiyasuddin Bahadur Shah.Although the mosque was built under the suri rule, the architectural pattern was not influenced by the earlier Suri architecture of North India. It was constructed with a Bengal style. At the eastern central entrance, inscription mentioned the time period of construction of the mosque to 966 AH (1558-59 AD).
Current Condition
The mosque was badly damaged during the earthquake in 1987. Kushumba mosque is also known as Kala Pahar, Kala Rotno which means Black Pearl. Possible reason: During the massive earthquake of 1897 the mosque was damaged severely, but stood firmly. Another reason can be for such name is the black plaster of stones at the outer wall. Now the mosque is protected by the Department of Archaeology of Bangladesh. The mosque is an attraction that is marveled at and studied, due its wonderful architectural style and elaborate decorations.
Structure
The mosque lies inside a walled enclosure with a monumental gateway with standing spaces for guards. The inscription tablet is totally in Arabic, except the part "built by" is in Persian.Walking up to the mosque, visitors will be greeted by a massive gateway, which is the only entrance to the mosque that is protected by a surrounding wall. One can almost imagine the guards outside, still protecting this breathtaking building. The foundation and most of the building was constructed from bricks, although the outer walls, some interior walls, side screens and columns are of stone. Bunches of grapes and vines curve in an almost serpentine manner on the mihrab frames, and kalasas, tendrils, and rosettes are reduced to dots. The platform edge has grape vine decoration, and there are rosettes on the spandrels of the arches supporting the platform, as well as on the mihrab wall. The central Mihrab is designed in the west. Opposite the central and southeastern entrances, the interior west wall has two mihrabs. There is division in the two mihrabs and they had different platforms. That is because the time of construction the general public was separated from officials and nobility during the prayers.

Manda Roghunath Jio Temple

Pakuria Shaheed Nagor(killing Field)

Shah Agriculture Museum

Administration
Manda Thana was formed in 1943 and it was turned into an upazila in 1987.

Manda Upazila is divided into 14 union parishads: Bhalain, Bharso, Bishnupur, Ganeshpur, Kalikapur, Kansopara, Kashab, Kusumba, Manda, Moinam, Nurullabad, Paranpur, Proshadpur, and Tentulia. The union parishads are subdivided into 299 mauzas and 293 villages.

Education
 Alalpur Haji Sheikh Alam High School
 Baidiapur High School
 Balubazar S.M. High School
 Balubazar Shafiuddin Molla College
 Bandubi Hazi Ismail Hossen High School         
 Bathoil Gopal Pramanik High School
 Bharso High School
 Bilkorilla B.M. High School
 Chakkamdeb Technical and BM college
 Chakuli Bahumokhi Madhumik Biddaloy
 Chakuli Degree College
 Chakuli High School
 Daspara Degree College
 Daspara High School
 Ekrukhi High School
 Engr: Showkatara Apple school and college
 Fotapur Kolimuddin College
 Ghona Adorshah High School & College
 Goal Manda High School
 Gobindapur High School
 Got Gari Shaheed Mamun High School and College
 Jotbazer Girls' School and College
 Kaligram Dodangi High School
 Kalikapur Chak Kalikapur High School
 Kanchan B.L High School
 Kanso Para Uccho Biddaloy
 Koyapara Kamarkuri High School
 Kusumba D.P.B High School
 Mainam High School & College
 Manda Business Management Institute
 Manda Momin Shahana Govt. Degree College
 Manda Pilot High School & College
 Nurullabad M/L High School
 P.K.A. High School
 Paranpur High School
 Pakuria United High School
 Panial Adarsha College
 Prashadpur Girls High School
 Ramnagar Government primary & high school
 Satihat K.T. High School
 Shafiuddin Mollha College, Balubazar
 Shahapur D.A. High School
 Singihat K.D School
 South Mainam High School & College
 Tentulia D.B. High School
 Turuk Baria High School

Madrasas
 Banishar Dakhil Madrasha
 Bolshing Chakbabon Dakhil Madrasha
 Boro Belal Daho Fazil Madrasha
 Boro Belal Daho Fazil Madrasha (ALAMGIR HOSEN)
 Borobelaldaho fazil madrasha (ALAMGIR HOSEN)
 Chakuli Koumi Madrasha
 Chalkharinarayan Dhakhil Madrsha
 Chhoto Chalk Champak Dakhil Madrasah
 Deul Durgapur Al Arabia Dakhil Madrasha
 Dusti Dakhil Madrasha
 Fotepur Dakhil Madrasha(1963)
 Jafrabad Adorsho Dakhil Madrasha
 Khodarghat Dakhil Madrasha
 Kukrail Abtadai Madrasha
 Paranpur Kamil Madrasha
 Ramnagar Dhakil madrasa
 Zafrabad Adorso Dakhil Madrasha

Notable residents
 Emaz Uddin Pramanik, MP
 Shamsul Alam Pramanik, MP

See also 
 Upazilas of Bangladesh
 Districts of Bangladesh
 Divisions of Bangladesh

References 

Upazilas of Naogaon District